Salpausselän Reipas (abbreviated SalReipas) is a football club from Lahti in Finland.  The club was formed in 2004 and their home ground is at the Mukkulan kenttä.  The first team currently plays in the Kolmonen (Third Division), the fourth tier of Finnish football.  The Chairman of SalReipas is Tero Rantala.

History
The club was founded in 2004 and has made rapid progress since they began competitive football with the SPL Uusimaa in 2005 in Section 7 of the Kutonen (Sixth Division) which they won at the first attempt.  Further promotions followed in the next two seasons in 2006 and 2007 when the club won Section 3 of the Vitonen (Fifth Division) and Section 2 of the Nelonen (Fourth Division) respectively.  In their first three seasons the club only lost 1 league match and won the other 55 matches, scoring 322 goals in the process.  In the last two seasons SalReipas have competed in Section 3 of the Kolmonen finishing 4th in 2008 and 2nd in 2009.  The latter season was a great disappointment with the club missing out on promotion by 2 points to local rivals City Stars.

In the 2010 Finnish Cup (Suomen Cup) SalReipas showed both their pedigree and future potential by reaching Round 6 before finally going out 1–2 at home to Ilves.  Highlights of the competition were home wins against Kakkonen opposition – 4–1 against Lohjan Pallo and 2–0 against Laajasalon Palloseura.

SalReipas Akatemia began operations in October 2009 as the club's second team.  The team was established to serve the needs of young hopefuls who are not yet ready for first team football.  They created a club record on 24 May 2010 with a 25–0 win against Hyvinkään Urheiluseura 1. Their home ground is at the Kisapuiston tekonurmi.

Season to season

3 seasons in Kolmonen
1 season in Nelonen
1 season in Vitonen
1 season in Kutonen

Honours and achievements
Kutonen (Section 7) Winners – 2005
Vitonen (Section 3) Winners – 2006
Nelonen (Section 2) Winners – 2007
Round 6 of Finnish Cup – 2010

Club Structure
SalReipas have 2 men's teams.  The club does not currently run a junior section.

2010 season
SalReipas Men's Team are competing in Section 3 (Lohko 3) of the Kolmonen administered by Uusimaa SPL.  This is the fourth highest tier in the Finnish football system.  In 2009 Salpausselän Reipas finished in second position in Section 3 of the Kolmonen (Third Division).

SalReipas Akatemia are participating in Section 7 (Lohko 7) of the Kutonen administered by the Uusimaa SPL.

References and sources
Official Website
Suomen Cup

Footnotes

Football clubs in Finland
Sport in Lahti
2004 establishments in Finland